Eidsdal is a village and valley in Fjord Municipality in Møre og Romsdal county, Norway. The local church, Norddal Church is located in nearby Norddal village. Eidsdal has approximately 400 inhabitants.

The valley stretches from the Norddalsfjorden up to the lake Eidsvatnet in the direction of Geiranger. Eidsdal is part of "The Golden Route", a well known tourist route that connects Eidsdal and Geiranger with Romsdal and Trollstigen.  Norwegian County Road 63 runs north and south through the Eidsdal valley, with a ferry connection to Linge, across the fjord.

Eidsdal is mainly an agricultural village. Most farmers are engaged in milk production with cows and goats. Tourism is the second major economic activity in Eidsdal. There are several campgrounds, cabins, and room rentals. Furthermore, there has been considerable investment in building cabins in recent years.

Gallery

References

 
Villages in Møre og Romsdal
Fjord (municipality)